Ecotricity is a British energy company based in Stroud, Gloucestershire, England, specialising in selling green energy to consumers that it primarily generates from its 87.2 megawatt wind power portfoliothe company prefers the term windmill rather than wind turbine. It is built on the principle of heavily reinvesting its profit in building more of its own green energy generation.

The company was founded in 1995 by Dale Vince, who remains in control; in 2022 he announced an intention to sell the company, which has around 200,000 domestic and business customers. Besides the supply of gas and electricity, Ecotricity's initiatives include the creation of one of Britain's first electric vehicle charging networks, which was sold to Gridserve in 2021.

History
Ecotricity was started by Dale Vince in 1995 as Renewable Energy Company Limited, with a single wind turbine he had used to power an old army truck in which he lived on a hill near Stroud.

From that, Vince went on to build commercial wind-monitoring equipment, which the company still does today, using the name Nexgen. Ecotricity started generation with a 40-metre turbine in 1996, which at the time was the largest in the country.

In 2007, Vince ran an advertisement on the back page of The Guardian newspaper inviting Richard Branson to his house to discuss solutions to climate change over a carbon-free breakfast. The ad ran the day after Branson appeared on TV with American former vice president Al Gore, who had managed to persuade Branson that climate change was an issue. The ad included Vince's personal mobile phone number.

Ecotricity was a winner in the 2007 Ashden Awards for sustainable energy. The awards congratulated Ecotricity for its environmental contribution, saying: "The company's turbines are delivering 46 GW·h/yr of renewable electricity and avoiding around 46,000 tonnes of CO2 emissions a year. The installed capacity is expected to double by the end of 2007."

In July 2009, Ecotricity started legal proceedings against French power company EDF Energy for the alleged misuse of the green Union Flag logo, used to promote EDF's Team Green Britain campaign. Ecotricity had previously used a green Union flag in its own advertising and claimed confused customers had contacted it to ask why Ecotricity was co-operating with EDF.

In January 2012, it was announced that Ecotricity has invested in the development of Searaser pump-to-shore wave energy machines, and in June said they were to be deployed in the autumn of that year. In October 2014 Ecotricity and marine consultants DNV GL were moving from laboratory trials to sea trials.

In 2013, Ecotricity's electricity supply became 100% renewable, rather than a mix.

In October 2014, it was announced that Ecotricity had partnered with Skanska to build and finance new turbines, which added a further 100MW to its existing 70 MW capacity, The following month, the company decided not to attempt new planning applications in England because of the political climate, instead concentrating on Scotland. It went on to spin its small turbine manufacturer out into a subsidiary called Britwind, which, in collaboration with a local company, offered free electricity to crofters in return for installing a small turbine, keeping any excess power generated.

In March 2015, Ecotricity announced it had refinanced its existing wind farms with the aim of using the extra capital to expand production to 100 megawatts by November 2016.

In 2016 Ecotricity had approximately a 25% shareholding stake in competitor Good Energy, which has been sustained to 2020.

In the 2017/2018 financial year the company had a turnover of £176 million, with a gross profit of £55 million and a loss on ordinary activities before tax of £4.9 million, but after charges and revaluation of investments had a "Total comprehensive (loss) for the year" of £9.5 million. It gave £416,000 to charity.

By 2019, the company had 200,000 customers. A corporate restructure in 2020 created Green Britain Group Limited; the company's directors are Dale Vince and Kate Vince, and its subsidiaries include Ecotricity Limited and Forest Green Rovers Football Club Limited.

In January 2021 the company agreed to buy 3 Megawatt-hours yearly from United Downs Deep Geothermal Power, the UK first geothermal plant. In summer 2021, Ecotricity made a bid to take over Good Energy, where it already owned 27% of the shares, which was rejected.

In April 2022, Dale Vince stated an intention to sell the company. It was reported that the company planned to build a further 2,500MW of renewable energy generation, which would require investment of some £2billion.

Tariffs
Before August 2013, Ecotricity ran a mix of fuels. Ecotricity's proportion of renewable energy rose from 24.1% in 2007 to 51.1% in 2011 (compared with a national average of 7.9%), with plans for a further increase to 60% by 2012

In the past, a substantial proportion of the electricity (25.9% in 2007) sold by Ecotricity to customers came from nuclear sources. This proportion had decreased to 16% by 2010, and 2.6% by 2011. Ecotricity also provided a 100% renewable energy tariff called New Energy Plus, in which renewable energy was bought in from other suppliers to top up renewable energy produced by Ecotricity.

Wind 
In Conisholme in Lincolnshire on 8 January 2009 two of the blades of one of the company's turbines were damaged. In February 2013 the go-ahead was given for Ecotricity to build its largest windfarm, a 66 megawatt, 22 turbine farm at Heckington Fen in Lincolnshire

In February 2013 Ecotricity revealed a prototype 6 kW vertical axis wind turbine called the "urbine".

Solar 
Ecotricity also produces solar energy, with its first "sun park" opening in 2011. In April 2016 it bought SunEdison's UK business supplying domestic solar panels.

Gas 
From May 2010 it became the first UK company to supply eco-friendly gas, produced in the Netherlands by anaerobic digestion of sugar beet waste and in 2015 it was planning to have its own digesters fed by locally sourced grass from marginal land of grade 3 or poorer by 2017. The first of these would have produced 78.8GWh a year from 75,000t of grass and forage rye silage.

In August 2015 Ecotricity announced plans to build an anaerobic digester at Sparsholt College in Hampshire that would take grasscuttings from local farms and supply the resulting six megawatts of gas to the grid with the overall aim of training students in the technology. This joined the first announced in Gloucestershire in April and was followed by a third three megawatt plant announced in August in Somerset.

On 25 April 2016 planning permission for the site at Sparsholt College was refused. In July 2016, a new application was made to build the facility at the college site, which was approved in October 2016. The new proposal included "[...] new and revised traffic data and assessment, new traffic plans to keep vehicle movements away from Sparsholt village and a commitment to protect local road infrastructure.".  Also, "[Ecotricity] consulted representatives of the nearby parish councils and incorporated their requests, wherever possible into the routing plans and operational controls."

By the start of 2019 the company had not built any biogas plants but still intended to do so.

Microtricity feed-in tariff
Ecotricity offers the Feed-in Tariff as a voluntary licensee under the name "Microtricity", offering payments to people who generate and export electricity from low-carbon sources such as solar panels.

, Ecotricity does not offer a Smart Export Guarantee tariff to small low-carbon generators such as domestic solar panel systems.

Side projects

Greenbird
Ecotricity is the sponsor of the Ecotricity Greenbird, a land yacht that set a new world land speed record for wind-powered vehicles on 26 March 2009 on the dry Lake Ivanpah.

Nemesis
Ecotricity has built an electric sports car called Nemesis that was built as a demonstration of what electric cars are capable of: an endurance trip from Land's End to John o' Groats is planned recharging only from electricity produced by wind power.

Vehicle recharging
In July 2011 Ecotricity launched a free vehicle charging network sited around the country at 14 of the Welcome Break Motorway service areas, linking London in the south with Exeter in the west and Edinburgh in the north. The charging points were initially equipped with both a UK standard 13amp domestic socket and a high power IEC 62196 32amp 3-phase socket. It is to build wind turbines and vehicle charging points at RoadChef sites across the UK to allow vehicles to recharge directly from the wind.

In October 2012 the company started to add 50 kW CHAdeMO fast charging to its charging stations allowing compatible cars to recharge within 30 minutes. In April 2014 it was announced that it would be adding support for Combined Charging System connectors from May and the September had over 120 chargers. 
In May 2014 it brought an interim high-court injunction against electric car manufacturer Tesla over its vehicle charging network; this was resolved in an out of court settlement.

In 2014 the Ecotricity vehicle charging network had sporadic software problems to do with the addition of a new connector which left some chargers not working or not connecting to specific cars.

As of December 2014 it covered 90% of the motorway service stations including Land's End and John o' Groats. By December 2015 it had 6,500 members using it once a week or more, and the network, which had hitherto been free of charge, would henceforth require payment. In an interview in March 2016 Vince announced that payment would start in a couple of months and the money from it would be used to improve and extend the network.

From 11 July 2016 Ecotricity started charging £5 for a 20-minute fast-charge, later changed to £6 for 30 minutes but kept it free for customers of Ecotricity. Following feedback from customers, a balance between the needs of EV drivers and PHEV drivers has led to a £3 connection fee, waived for Ecotricity customers, and 17p per KWh.

In 2018 the Ecotricity EV tariff on its motorway network was 30p/KWh for non-Ecotricity customers and half this for customers using the Rapid charger network. The access is via a mobile phone app. To help with using this most of the network 'pumps' are being fitted with short range, restricted, WiFi to enable connection in poor mobile signal areas.

By the start of 2019 Ecotricity was providing over 300 charging points.

In early 2021, Ecotricity and GRIDSERVE announced a new partnership to power the Electric Highway.  The new major collaboration is leading transformation with two elements – already underway.  Firstly, all existing chargers will be replaced with new technology, doubling the capacity – offering all three connection types (CCS, CHAdeMO, and AC) and contactless payment. Secondly – a further 6 to 12 pumps of the all-new 350 kW high power standard will be installed. Funding for the program is being provided by Hitachi Capital (UK) PLC, also a shareholder in GRIDSERVE.

In mid 2021, It was announced that GRIDSERVE had purchased the remaining stake from Ecotricity, taking full ownership of the Electric Highway. Their first element of the modernisation plans for the charging network are continuing as planned with the intention of all Electric Highway sites having their phase 1 charger replacements complete by the end of summer 2021. GRIDSERVE's other charging network, the Electric Forecourt scheme also continues to be rolled out separately, according to original plans.

Distributed energy storage
Ecotricity has investigated supplying 100 houses with an internet-connected grid energy storage system that will take the homes off the grid at peak times.

Mobile phone network 
Ecotricity launched a mobile virtual network called Ecotalk in 2018; plans had been discussed by Vince in 2013. Money from customer's bills is used to buy land for nature conservation, in part through a partnership with the RSPB.

Small turbine manufacture 
In May 2014, Ecotricity rescued Evance, a manufacturer of small (5 kW) wind turbines, from administration, saving the company's 29 jobs. Branded "Brit Wind" in January 2017 they announced one million pounds worth of sales to Japan as well as sales to France, Norway, Denmark, the US and Belgium.

Political donations 
The company has donated to several political parties that support subsidies for renewable energy. In November 2013 it donated £20,000 to the Green Party. On 10 February 2015 Ecotricity announced that it would be donating £250,000 to the electoral fighting fund of the UK Labour Party. This decision alienated some of its customers, in particular supporters of the Green Party as they felt some Labour policies are at odds with Ecotricity's avowed green ethical stance.

Ecotricity had already donated £120,000 to Labour in November 2014, including £20,000 to the local group in Stroud which was trying (unsuccessfully) to unseat Neil Carmichael, an opponent of wind farms in Gloucestershire. In the six months before the 2015 general election Ecotricity donated a total of £380,000 to Labour. The day after the election of 7 May 2015 the company donated £50,000 to the Liberal Democrats, including £20,000 to the group in the Kingston upon Thames constituency which had been lost by Ed Davey, the pro-renewables Secretary of State for Energy and Climate Change.

Ecotricity donated £20,000 to Keir Starmer's 2020 Labour Party leadership election campaign.

Grid-level storage 
At the end of 2017 Ecotricity was granted planning permission to build one of the UK's first grid scale battery storage projects on its Alveston site. The 10 megawatt project is intended to share the grid connection with the three new windmills there, providing the company with peak-shaving.

Virtual power plant 
In May 2018 it was announced that Ecotricity would start building a Virtual power plant to more efficiently use and manage the electricity usage.

Diamonds 
In October 2020, Vince announced the company would make lab grown diamonds using carbon dioxide captured from the air, water and power from their own green supply.

See also

Green electricity in the United Kingdom
Wind power in the United Kingdom
Energy policy of the United Kingdom
Energy in the United Kingdom

References

External links
 

Renewable energy companies of England
Wind power companies of England
Power stations in South West England
Companies based in Stroud, Gloucestershire
British companies established in 1996
Energy companies established in 1996
Renewable resource companies established in 1996
1996 establishments in England